Ararat Airport  is  south-west of Ararat, Victoria, Australia on the Western Highway. Its main function is as a gliding club.

See also
 List of airports in Victoria

References

External links
 Aerodromes Civil Aviation Safety Authority

Airports in Victoria (Australia)